Pavla Chrástová (born March 14, 1979 in Znojmo, Jihomoravský) is a retired female medley swimmer from the Czech Republic, who competed for her native country at the 1996 Olympic Games in Atlanta, Georgia.

References
 sports-reference

1979 births
Living people
Czech female swimmers
Female medley swimmers
Swimmers at the 1996 Summer Olympics
Olympic swimmers of the Czech Republic
People from Znojmo
Sportspeople from the South Moravian Region